The following are the Pulitzer Prizes for 1949.

Journalism awards

Public Service:
 Nebraska State Journal for the campaign establishing the "Nebraska All-Star Primary" presidential preference primary which spotlighted, through a bi-partisan committee, issues early in the presidential campaign.
Local Reporting:
 Malcolm Johnson of the New York Sun for his series of 24 articles entitled "Crime on the Waterfront" in New York City.
National Reporting:
 C. P. Trussell of The New York Times for consistent excellence covering the national scene from Washington.
International Reporting:
 Price Day of The Baltimore Sun for his series of 12 articles entitled, "Experiment in Freedom: India and Its First Year of Independence".
Editorial Writing:
 Herbert Elliston of The Washington Post for distinguished editorial writing during the year.
 John H. Crider of the Boston Herald for distinguished editorial writing during the year.
Editorial Cartooning:
 Lute Pease of the Newark Evening News for "Who, Me?"
Photography:
 Nathaniel Fein of the New York Herald-Tribune for his photo, "Babe Ruth Bows Out".

Letters, Drama and Music Awards

Fiction:
 Guard of Honor by James Gould Cozzens (Harcourt).
Drama:
 Death of a Salesman by Arthur Miller (Viking).
History:
 The Disruption of American Democracy by Roy Franklin Nichols.
Biography or Autobiography:
 Roosevelt and Hopkins by Robert E. Sherwood.
Poetry:
 Terror and Decorum by Peter Viereck.
Music:
 Music for the film Louisiana Story by Virgil Thomson (G. Schirmer) released in 1948 by Robert J. Flaherty Productions.

References

External links
Pulitzer Prizes for 1949

Pulitzer Prizes by year
Pulitzer Prize
Pulitzer Prize